Russ Buller (born September 10, 1978) is an American former athlete who specialized in the pole vault.

Raised in Westlake, Louisiana, Buller competed on the athletics team at the Louisiana State University and became the most successful pole vaulter in the program's history. In 2000 he won both the indoor and outdoor NCAA Division I championships. He was a seven-time All-American and six-time SEC champion.

Buller won the pole vault at the 2006 USA Outdoor Track and Field Championships, finishing ahead of Olympic silver medalist Toby Stevenson, who he had been second to at the 2003 Pan American Games in Santo Domingo. His career also included an appearance at the 2001 World Championships in Edmonton, a fourth place finish at the 2001 Summer Universiade in Beijing and a fifth placing at the 2006 IAAF World Cup in Athens.

Personal life
Buller is married to Canadian Olympic pole vaulter Dana Ellis.

References

External links

1978 births
Living people
American male pole vaulters
People from Westlake, Louisiana
Track and field athletes from Louisiana
World Athletics Championships athletes for the United States
Competitors at the 2001 Summer Universiade
LSU Tigers track and field athletes
Pan American Games silver medalists for the United States
Pan American Games medalists in athletics (track and field)
Medalists at the 2003 Pan American Games
Athletes (track and field) at the 2003 Pan American Games
20th-century American people
21st-century American people